Thalathoides is a genus of moths of the family Noctuidae. The genus was erected by Jeremy Daniel Holloway in 1989.

Species
 Thalathoides conjecturalis Swinhoe, 1890
 Thalathoides curtalis Holloway, 1989

References

Acronictinae